Alphonsus M. ("Phons") O'Mara (13 October 1887 – 16 February 1958) was a businessman and Irish republican Mayor of Limerick 1918-20.  O'Mara was a son of Stephen O'Mara, Snr, himself a former Mayor of Limerick and briefly an Irish Parliamentary Party MP. Phons O'Mara was the brother of another Mayor, Stephen M. O'Mara. In 1918 he stripped Windham Wyndham-Quin, 4th Earl of Dunraven and Mount-Earl of the freedom of the City because of Dunraven's support for conscription.  In 1919 he helped negotiate the end of the Limerick Soviet.  His business activity related to the family bacon business, and he became owner of Donnolly's bacon factory.

References

1887 births
1958 deaths
20th-century Irish businesspeople
Mayors of Limerick (city)
Businesspeople from Limerick (city)